bTV Radio is a Bulgarian radio station, part of bTV Radio Group, owned by the Central European Media Enterprises (owned by WarnerMedia/AT&T). It started broadcasting on May 1, 2009 in Sofia, and later launched in Pernik and Gotse Delchev. Its program is also transmitted via satellite across Europe. The station was originally launched as a radio program of the television station PRO.BG - PRO.FM. In October 2011, it was re-branded as the eponymous radio station of the television channel bTV, transmitting much of the television output. The radio broadcasts exclusively in Sofia.

Logos history

References 

Radio stations established in 2009
Radio stations in Bulgaria
Mass media in Sofia